Alexandria City Public Schools (ACPS) is a school division which is funded by the government of Alexandria, Virginia, United States.

Administration

Superintendent 
The superintendent of Alexandria City Public Schools is Gregory C. Hutchings, Jr. Before being appointed in 2018, he was the superintendent of Shaker Heights City School District. Hutchings was also the Alexandria City Public Schools Director of PreK-12 programs, a principal in Metropolitan Nashville Public Schools, an assistant principal in Metropolitan Nashville Public Schools and Chesterfield County Public Schools, and a teacher in Prince William County Public Schools.

School Board 
There are nine members of the Alexandria City Public School Board. All members of the board are elected by district, and the chair is appointed by the board. There are also two student representatives.

Members 
District A

 Jacinta Greene
 Michelle Rief
 Christopher A. Suarez

District B

 Cindy M. Anderson
 Margaret Lorber
 Veronica R. Nolan, Vice Chair

District C

 Meagan L. Alderton, Chair
 Ramee Gentry
 Heather Thornton

Student Representatives

 Lorraine Jackson
 Ashley Sanchez-Viafara

History

The first school offering public education in Alexandria was founded in 1785, the Washington Free School, partly funded by George Washington.

Although the desegregation process began in 1959 when nine black school children entered all-white Theodore Ficklin Elementary School after an NAACP lawsuit, it was not until 1974 that Superintendent John Albohm announced "This year, we have finally reorganized our elementary schools and, in a broad sense, have completed the desegregation of our school system kindergarten through grade 12".

In November 2020, the school board unanimously voted to rename T. C. Williams High School and Matthew Maury Elementary School, with name selection coming before the 2021–22 school year. This follows years of community efforts to rename T. C. Williams because its namesake, a former superintendent of Alexandria City Public Schools, was a supporter of racial segregation in schools.

In March 2021, the superintendent put forward two final names after community input: "Alexandria High School" and "Naomi Brooks Elementary School", after a former teacher who died in 2020. The school board voted in April 2021 to change the school's names to Alexandria City High School and Naomi L. Brooks Elementary School.

Schools

The Alexandria City Public Schools consists of the following schools.

Elementary schools

John Adams Elementary School (Grades PreK–5)
Charles Barrett Elementary School (Grades PreK–5), named for Charles D. Barrett, a Marine officer killed in World War II who had lived in Alexandria
Ferdinand T. Day Elementary School, named after civil rights icon Ferdinand T. Day, who was the first African American elected chair of a public school board
Cora Kelly School for Math, Science and Technology (Grades PreK–5), named for local former teacher Cora Webster Kelly
Lyles-Crouch Traditional Academy
Douglas MacArthur Elementary School
George Mason Elementary School
Matthew Maury Elementary School
Mount Vernon Community School
James K. Polk Elementary School
William Ramsay Elementary School (Grades PreK–5)
Samuel W. Tucker Elementary School, named for Alexandria native and notable civil rights lawyer Samuel W. Tucker

K–8 schools

Patrick Henry PreK-8 School (Grades PreK–8)
Jefferson-Houston PreK-8 IB School (Grades PreK–8)

Middle schools

George Washington Middle School
Francis C. Hammond Middle School, named for Francis C. Hammond, a native Alexandria who was killed in action during the Korean War and received the Medal of Honor

High schools

 Alexandria City High School (Grades 10–12)
 Alexandria City High School Minnie Howard Campus (Grade 9)

See also

 List of school divisions in Virginia

References

External links
 
 ACPS Express

Education in Alexandria, Virginia
Northern Virginia
School divisions in Virginia